"Chinatown, My Chinatown" is a popular song written by William Jerome (words) and Jean Schwartz (music) in 1906 and later interpolated into the musical Up and Down Broadway (1910).  The song has been recorded by numerous artists and is considered an early jazz standard.

Composition
Tin Pan Alley songwriters Jean Schwartz and William Jerome began their partnership in 1901, and collaborated successfully for more than a decade.  They composed many popular songs together, including million-sellers "Mister Dooley" and "Bedelia". "Chinatown, My Chinatown" is considered their biggest hit, but it did not catch on when they wrote it in 1906, and the musical revue it was added to in 1910, Up and Down Broadway, was not especially successful.  By the time "Chinatown, My Chinatown" became a national hit in 1915, the two were no longer collaborating.

The melody of the song uses pentatonicism, while the harmonies employ many parallel fourths and fifths, a common exoticist technique of the time based on Western stereotypes of Chinese and other East Asian musics.  Through these musical techniques as well as racist lyrics, the song participates in the history of Orientalism.

The original tempo of the song was slow; later it was adapted to a fox-trot tempo, reflecting the popularity of the dance.  Still later, jazz musicians played the song at a "hot jazz" tempo.

Recording history
"Chinatown, My Chinatown" has been recorded by numerous artists. Several recordings in late 1914 presaged its popularity in 1915 when the American Quartet with Billy Murray had a number one record on Victor, and Grace Kerns and John Barnes Wells also had a popular recording on Columbia.  The same year, Columbia also released a version by Prince's Orchestra, in a one-step medley with Alabama Jubilee and Sam Ash recorded an abbreviated version of it for the Columbia-affiliated, bargain-priced Little Wonder Records. At least 25 jazz recordings of the song were done between 1928 and 1942; seven were recorded in 1935 alone.  Fletcher Henderson, Louis Armstrong, Louis Prima, and Lionel Hampton were among the many jazz artists who recorded this song in the 1930s.  Its recording history is one of the elements that qualifies it as an early jazz standard.

See also
List of pre-1920 jazz standards

Notes

References
Citations

Bibliography

Birnbaum, Larry. Before Elvis: The Prehistory of Rock 'n' Roll. Rowman & Littlefield (2013). .
Crawford, Richard; Magee, Jeffery. Jazz Standards on Record, 1900–1942: A Core Repertory. Chicago: Center for Black Music Research Columbia College (1992).
Garrett, Charles Hiroshi. Struggling to Define a Nation: American Music and the Twentieth Century. University of California Press (2008). .
Goldmark, Daniel. Tunes for 'Toons: Music and the Hollywood Cartoon. University of California Press (2005). .
Harrison, Max; Fox, Charles; Thacker, Eric; and Stuart Nicholson. The Essential Jazz Records: Modernism to Postmodernism. A&C Black (2000). .
Harvey, Adam. The Soundtracks of Woody Allen: A Complete Guide to the Songs and Music in Every Film, 1969–2005. McFarland (2007). .
Hoffmann, Frank. Encyclopedia of Recorded Sound. Routledge (2004). .
Jerome, William; Schwartz, Jean. "Chinatown, My Chinatown" (sheet music). New York: Jerome H Remick & Co. (1910).
Magee, Jeffrey. The Uncrowned King of Swing: Fletcher Henderson and Big Band Jazz. Oxford University Press (2004). .
Moon, Krystyn R. Yellowface: Creating the Chinese in American Popular Music and Performance, 1850s–1920s. Rutgers University Press (2005).
Reinhart, Mark S. Chet Atkins: The Greatest Songs of Mister Guitar. McFarland (2014). .
Ruhlmann, William. Breaking Records: 100 Years of Hits. Routledge (2004). .
Tyler, Don. Hit Songs, 1900–1955: American Popular Music of the Pre-Rock Era. McFarland (2007). .

External links
"Chinatown, My Chinatown", 1914 recording by the American Quartet with Billy Murray, at the Library of Congress National Jukebox
"Chinatown, My Chinatown", 1928 recording by Art Gillham, at the Internet Archive, Audio Archive

1910 songs
1932 singles
1910s jazz standards
Songs with lyrics by William Jerome
Songs with music by Jean Schwartz
Articles containing video clips